Khoshkrud Rural District or Khoshk Rud Rural District may refer to:
 Khoshkrud Rural District (Markazi Province)
 Khoshk Rud Rural District (Mazandaran Province)